Dasada is one of the 182 Legislative Assembly constituencies of Gujarat state in India. It is part of Surendranagar district and is reserved for candidates belonging to the Scheduled Castes.

List of segments
This assembly seat represents the following segments

 Dasada Taluka

 Lakhtar Taluka

 Patdi Taluka (Part) Villages – Moti Kathechi, Nani Kathechi, Gadthal, Jaliyala, Bhagwanpar, Ranagadh, Fulwadi, Rojasar, Dhalwana, Mulbavla, Digvijaygadh, Dhirajgadh, Parali, Bhathan, Laxmisar, Shiyani, Jambu, Parnala, Jasmatpar, Jalampar.

Members of Legislative Assembly

Election candidate

2022 
 

-->

Election results

2017

2012

See also
 List of constituencies of the Gujarat Legislative Assembly
 Surendranagar district

References

External links
 

Assembly constituencies of Gujarat
Surendranagar district